Rock the Coast is a concert put on by Muskegon, Michigan-based Alive on the Lakeshore.  The event was presented for several years at the amusement park Michigan's Adventure.  As of 2017, Rock the Coast took place at Ottawa County Fairgrounds in Holland, Michigan. It features Christian artists, including Crowder, Hillsong Young & Free, Plumb, Josh Wilson, Audio Adrenaline, Roper, and Toby Mac. Rock the Coast is typically held in May. In the past, the concert has featured several acts, among those Kutless, Family Force Five, BarlowGirl, Hawk Nelson, Everlife, Fireflight, John Reuben, and Superchick.

The festival is a member of the Christian Festival Association.

External links
 Official Site
 Page on Michigan's Adventure's website

Christian music festivals